Uebigau-Wahrenbrück is a town in the Elbe-Elster district, in southwestern Brandenburg, Germany. It is situated on the river Schwarze Elster, 11 km northwest of Bad Liebenwerda, and 21 km east of Torgau.

Geography
The town is composed by the villages of Bahnsdorf, Beiersdorf, Beutersitz, Bomsdorf, Bönitz, Domsdorf, Drasdo, Kauxdorf, Langennaundorf, Marxdorf, München/Elster, Neudeck, Prestewitz, Rothstein, Saxdorf, Uebigau (municipal seat), Wahrenbrück, Wiederau, Wildgrube, Winkel and Zinsdorf.

History
From 1815 to 1944, the constituent localities of Uebigau-Wahrenbrück were part of the Prussian Province of Saxony. From 1944 to 1945, they were part of the Province of Halle-Merseburg. From 1952 to 1990, they were part of the Bezirk Cottbus of East Germany. On 31 December 2001, the town of Uebigau-Wahrenbrück was formed by merging the towns of Uebigau and Wahrenbrück with the municipalities of Bahnsdorf, Drasdo and Wiederau.

Demography

See also
Marxdorfer Wolfshund

Sons and daughters of the city 

 Johann Gottlieb Graun (1702–1771), composer
 Carl Heinrich Graun (1704–1759), composer
 Gustav Seyffarth (1796–1885), Egyptologist

References

External links

Localities in Elbe-Elster